D. ferruginea may refer to:
 Dryandra ferruginea, a synonym for Banksia rufa, a plant species
 Drymophila ferruginea, the ferruginous antbird, a bird species endemic to Brazil
 Dyckia ferruginea, a plant species native to Bolivia

See also
 Ferruginea (disambiguation)